Daxing is a town under the administration of Fengcheng, Liaoning, China. , it has six villages under its administration.

References 

Township-level divisions of Liaoning
Fengcheng, Liaoning